Vinicius Guedes (born 9 August 1999), commonly known as Guedes, is a Brazilian footballer who plays as a midfielder for Operário Ferroviário, on loan from Chapecoense.

Club career
Guedes was born in Tapera, Rio Grande do Sul, and joined Chapecoense's youth setup in 2016, after representing Internacional. Promoted to the first team for the 2020 season, he made his senior debut on 8 March of that year; after starting in a 3–0 Campeonato Catarinense home win against Joinville, he scored the club's third goal.

On 19 June 2020, Guedes renewed his contract with Chape until the end of 2022. He contributed with seven league appearances in the season, as his club achieved promotion to the Série A as champions.

Guedes made his debut in the top tier of Brazilian football on 13 June 2021, starting in a 0–0 home draw against Ceará.

Career statistics

Honours
Chapecoense
Campeonato Catarinense: 2020
Campeonato Brasileiro Série B: 2020

References

External links
Chapecoense profile 

1999 births
Living people
Sportspeople from Rio Grande do Sul
Brazilian footballers
Association football midfielders
Campeonato Brasileiro Série A players
Campeonato Brasileiro Série B players
Associação Chapecoense de Futebol players
Operário Ferroviário Esporte Clube players